The Sunderland Bridge is a crossing over the Connecticut River in western Massachusetts, connecting the towns of South Deerfield and Sunderland, carrying Massachusetts Route 116.

History and construction of the bridge
There was at least one preceding bridge at this location, a metal through-truss bridge destroyed by the floating Montague City Covered Bridge during the Flood of 1936.

The current Sunderland Bridge is a deck truss bridge completed in 1937.  Reconstruction of the bridge was completed in 1994. Replacement of the original art deco railings by modern ones was controversial.

References

See also 
List of crossings of the Connecticut River

Truss bridges in the United States
Bridges over the Connecticut River
Sunderland, Massachusetts
Deerfield, Massachusetts
Bridges completed in 1937
Bridges in Franklin County, Massachusetts
Bridges completed in 1994
Road bridges in Massachusetts
Metal bridges in the United States
1937 establishments in Massachusetts